The 1947 Howard Bison football team was an American football team that represented Howard University as a member of the Central Intercollegiate Athletic Association (CIAA) during the 1947 college football season. In their third season under head coach Edward Jackson, the team compiled a 6–2–1 record, finished fourth in the CIAA, and outscored opponents by a total of 122 to 54. The team ranked No. 11 among the nation's black college football teams according to the Pittsburgh Courier and its Dickinson Rating System.

Schedule

References

Howard
Howard Bison football seasons
Howard Bison football